Hans Jenssen (4 December 1817 – 13 June 1888) was a Norwegian businessperson.

He was born in Øyer, but came to Trondheim with his brother Torger (1822–1892) in 1834. The two established their own wholesale company H. & T. Jenssen in 1850. His brother withdrew in 1865, leaving the business to Hans.

Hans Jenssen also served as a deputy representative to the Norwegian Parliament in 1864, representing the constituency of the city of Trondheim.

Jenssen died in Trondheim.

References

1817 births
1888 deaths
Deputy members of the Storting
Politicians from Trondheim
Norwegian company founders
People from Øyer